Cascada is a musical group.

Cascada may also refer to:

 Opel Cascada, a car model
 Big Creek, California, previously called "Cascada"
 Cascada de Texolo, a waterfall located in Veracruz, Mexico
 Las Cascadas Water Park, in Aguadilla, Puerto Rico

See also
 Kaskade (born 1971), American DJ and record producer
 KASCADE, a European physics experiment (1996)
 Cascadia (disambiguation)
 Cascade (disambiguation)